The MCV EvoSeti (stylised as eVoSeti) is a low-floor double-decker bus body built by MCV Bus & Coach as a replacement for the MCV DD103. It was unveiled in May 2015.

Description
The EvoSeti is built on the Volvo B5TL and Volvo B5LH 2-axle chassis for the UK, also with the 12m and 12.8m tri-axle Volvo B8L for Hong Kong. Typically, UK examples have 1 passenger door for use outside London, or TfL specification dual door for London use. It is also available as an open-top bus.

Orders

The Go-Ahead Group is the largest operator of the EvoSeti. Go-Ahead London currently operate 99 EvoSetis on hybrid Volvo B5LH chassis as of August 2017. The first 20 entered service in April 2016 with London Central on routes 35 and 40. Additionally, morebus operate three closed-roof and nine open-top EvoSetis on their Purbeck Breezer services, utilising the diesel Volvo B5TL chassis.

Elsewhere in London, Tower Transit had 51 B5LH EvoSetis delivered in May 2017, while Golden Tours took delivery of 21 open top B5TL EvoSetis in 2015 and 2016, also taking on the first B8L EvoSetis in the UK in 2020. Metroline ordered EvoSeti bodied Volvo B5LHs initially for their takeovers of London routes 30, 113 and 274 before commencing repeat orders in 2018 and 2019.

East Yorkshire is another large operator of the type; the first production EvoSeti was delivered to East Yorkshire Motor Services on a Volvo B5TL chassis. This was followed by a £3.5 million order for 18 more B5TL EvoSetis, which were delivered through 2016 and 2017 for use primarily on long-distance routes to destinations such as York, Bridlington and Withernsea.

In October 2016, First South Yorkshire commenced operating a B5TL EvoSeti demonstrator on route X78 between Sheffield and Doncaster. This vehicle was subsequently purchased by Ensignbus, later passing to the Bath Bus Company. Four more B5TL EvoSetis were delivered new to the Bath fleet between 2017 and February 2020.

In Hong Kong, Kowloon Motor Bus operate a large fleet of tri-axle EvoSetis on the Volvo B8L chassis, initially taking on two examples for evaluation before a first order for 110 was completed in October 2020.

References

External links

Double-decker buses
Low-floor buses
Open-top buses
Vehicles introduced in 2015